This is a list of notable people reported as having died from coronavirus disease 2019 (COVID-19), as a result of infection by the virus SARS-CoV-2 during the COVID-19 pandemic in North America.

Canada

Cuba

Haiti

Jamaica

Mexico

United States

Alabama

Alaska

Arizona

California

Colorado

Connecticut

Delaware

Florida

Georgia

Hawaii

Idaho

Illinois

Indiana

Iowa

Kansas

Kentucky

Louisiana

Maine

Maryland

Massachusetts

Michigan

Minnesota

Mississippi

Missouri

Montana

Nebraska

Nevada

New Hampshire

New Jersey

New Mexico

New York

North Carolina

North Dakota

Ohio

Oklahoma

Oregon

Pennsylvania

Rhode Island

Puerto Rico

South Carolina

South Dakota

Tennessee

Texas

Utah

Vermont

Virginia

Washington, D.C.

Washington (state)

Wisconsin

Wyoming

See also

 Deaths in 2020
 Deaths in 2021
 Deaths in 2022
 List of deaths due to COVID-19

Notes

Deaths
Deaths from the COVID-19 pandemic
COVID-19
COVID-19
COVID-19
COVID-19
Deaths
Deaths due to COVID-19
Deaths due to COVID-19